Damián Grosso Prijmak  (born 6 February 1975 in Castelar) is a former Argentine football goalkeeper.

Grosso made his professional debut in 1996 for Ferro Carril Oeste. He joined Almagro in 1997, helping them gain promotion to the Argentine Primera in 2000, after the club were relegated in 2001 he moved to Mexico where he played for Atlante F.C. and CD Veracruz before returning to Argentina in 2004. He played for Instituto de Córdoba, Quilmes, Talleres de Córdoba and recently in a second spell with Ferro Carril Oeste.

In January 2009, he signed for La Paz based club The Strongest.

References

External links
 Argentine Primera statistics  
 Es-mas profile 

1975 births
Living people
Sportspeople from Buenos Aires Province
Argentine people of Italian descent
Argentine people of Polish descent
Argentine footballers
Association football goalkeepers
Ferro Carril Oeste footballers
Club Almagro players
Atlante F.C. footballers
C.D. Veracruz footballers
Expatriate footballers in Mexico
Instituto footballers
Quilmes Atlético Club footballers
Talleres de Córdoba footballers
The Strongest players
Expatriate footballers in Bolivia
Argentine expatriate footballers
Argentine expatriate sportspeople in Bolivia
Argentine expatriate sportspeople in Mexico